Oakley, also been known as the Dr. John W. Franklin House, is a historic house near Gallatin, Tennessee, overlooking Old Hickory Lake. It was built in 1852 to a design by architect William Strickland. Oakley was listed on the National Register of Historic Places in 1985.

The property is privately owned. It has served as the home and studio of local artist Frank Gee.

References

Houses on the National Register of Historic Places in Tennessee
Gothic Revival architecture in Tennessee
Houses completed in 1852
Houses in Sumner County, Tennessee
National Register of Historic Places in Sumner County, Tennessee
1852 establishments in Tennessee